The string quintet normally comprises the four instruments of the standard string quartet (2 violins, viola, and cello), plus one additional instrument. This additional instrument may be a viola, cello or double bass. Of these three different combinations, the string quintet with a second viola has the widest repertoire and may be referred to as the standard string quintet. The other two combinations have far fewer important works, though the combination with two cellos includes the string quintet by Schubert, which is widely considered the greatest of all string quintets.

Ordering in each section is by surname of composer. These lists should be complete for major composers and their string quintets. For secondary or minor composers,  the lists are not exhaustive but those shown may be taken as representative examples. For recent or living composers, no attempt has been made at completeness.

"Viola" quintets
String quintets with 2 violins, 2 violas and cello

Arnold Bax (1883-1953)
String Quintet in G (1908)
Lyrical Interlude (1922)
Ludwig van Beethoven (1770-1827)
String Quintet in E flat, Op. 4 (1792-3; 1795–6)
String Quintet in C major, Op. 29 (1801)
String Quintet in C minor, Op. 104 (1793-5; 1817)
Luigi Boccherini (1743-1805)
String Quintet Op. 60 No. 1 in C major, G 391 (1801)
String Quintet Op. 60 No. 2 in B flat major, G 392 (1801)
String Quintet Op. 60 No. 3 in A major, G 393 (1801)
String Quintet Op. 60 No. 4 in E flat major, G 394 (1801; lost)
String Quintet Op. 60 No. 5 in G major, G 395 (1801)
String Quintet Op. 60 No. 6 in F major, G 396 (1801)
String Quintet Op. 62 No. 1 in C major, G 397 (1802)
String Quintet Op. 62 No. 2 in E flat major, G 398 (1802)
String Quintet Op. 62 No. 3 in F major, G 399 (1802)
String Quintet Op. 62 No. 4 in B flat major, G 400 (1802)
String Quintet Op. 62 No. 5 in D major, G 401 (1802)
String Quintet Op. 62 No. 6 in E major, G 402 (1802)
Also 12 further quintets arranged from piano quintets
Johannes Brahms (1833-1897)
String Quintet No. 1 in F major, Op. 88 (1883)
String Quintet No. 2 in G major, Op. 111 (1891)
Frank Bridge (1879-1941)
String Quintet in E minor, H 7 (1901)
Benjamin Britten (1913-1976)
Phantasy Quintet (1932)
Max Bruch (1838-1920)
String Quintet No. 1 in A minor (1918)
String Quintet No. 2 in E flat major (1918)
Anton Bruckner (1824-1896)
String Quintet in F major, WAB 112 (1878-9)
Intermezzo for String Quintet, WAB 113 (1879)
Franz Danzi (1763-1826)
String Quintet in E flat major, op. 66 no. 1 (1823-4)
String Quintet in F minor, op. 66 no. 2 (1823-4)
String Quintet in A major, op. 66 no. 3 (1823-4)
Gaetano Donizetti (1797-1848)
Allegro in C major
Antonín Dvořák (1841-1904)
String Quintet in A minor, Op. 1 (1861)
String Quintet in E-flat major, Op. 97 (1893)
François-Joseph Fétis (1784-1871)
String Quintet no. 1 in A minor (1860)
String Quintet no. 2 (1862)
String Quintet no. 3 (1862)
Niels Gade (1817-1890)
String Quintet in E minor, op. 8 (1845)
Joseph Haydn (1732-1809)
Divertimento in G major, Hob.II:2 (c. 1753)
Michael Haydn (1737-1806)
Quintet in C major, MH 187
Quintet in B flat major, MH 412
Quintet in F major, MH 367
Quintet in F major, MH 411
Quintet in G major, MH 189
Heinrich von Herzogenberg (1843-1900)
String Quintet in C minor, op. 77 (1892)
Felix Mendelssohn (1809-1847)
String Quintet No. 1 in A major, op. 18 (1826; 1832)
Minuet in F sharp minor (1826)
String Quintet No. 2 in B flat major, op. 87 (1845)
Wolfgang Amadeus Mozart (1756-1791)
 String Quintet in B-flat, K. 174 (1773)
 String Quintet in C major, K. 515 (1787)
 String Quintet in G minor, K. 516 (1787)
 String Quintet in C minor, K. 406/516b (1782; c. 1788)
 String Quintet in D major, K. 593 (1790)
 String Quintet in E-flat major, K. 614 (1791)
Carl Nielsen (1865-1931)
String Quintet in G major, FS 5 (1888)
George Onslow (1784-1853)
Three string quintets
Three further string quintets with two versions, either for 2 violins, 2 violas and cello or for 2 violins, viola and 2 cellos
Sir Hubert Parry (1848-1918)
String Quintet in E flat major (1883-4)
Anton Reicha (1770-1836)
Seven string quintets
Ferdinand Ries (1784-1838)
Five string quintets
Franz Schubert (1797-1828)
Overture in C minor, D. 8 (1811)
Louis Spohr (1784-1859)
Seven string quintets
Sir Charles Villiers Stanford (1852-1924)
String Quintet no. 1 in F major, op. 85 (1903)
String Quintet no. 2 in C minor, op. 86 (1903; unpublished)
Johan Svendsen (1840-1911)
String Quintet in C major, Op. 5 (1867)
Sergey Taneyev (1856-1915)
String Quintet no. 2 in C major, Op. 16 (1903-4)
Ralph Vaughan Williams (1872-1958)
Phantasy Quintet (1912)

"Cello" quintets
String quintets with 2 violins, viola and 2 cellos

David Baker (1931-2016)
Two Cello String Quintet (1987) Violoncello and string quartet (Commissioned by Janos Starker)
Ludwig van Beethoven
Kreutzer Sonata arranged for String Quintet (Simrock, 1832)
Luigi Boccherini (1743-1805)
String Quintet Op. 10 No. 1 in A major, G 265
String Quintet Op. 10 No. 2 in E flat major, G 266
String Quintet Op. 10 No. 3 in C minor, G 267
String Quintet Op. 10 No. 4 in C major, G 268
String Quintet Op. 10 No. 5 in E flat major, G 269
String Quintet Op. 10 No. 6 in D major, G 270
String Quintet Op. 11 No. 1 in B flat major, G 271
String Quintet Op. 11 No. 2 in A major, G 272
String Quintet Op. 11 No. 3 in C major, G 273
String Quintet Op. 11 No. 4 in F minor, G 274
String Quintet Op. 11 No. 5 in E major, G 275 (This quintet includes the well-known "Boccherini's Minuet")
String Quintet Op. 11 No. 6 in D major ("L'uccelliera" - "Bird Sanctuary"), G 276
String Quintet Op. 13 No. 1 in E flat major, G 277
String Quintet Op. 13 No. 2 in C major, G 278
String Quintet Op. 13 No. 3 in F major, G 279
String Quintet Op. 13 No. 4 in D minor, G 280
String Quintet Op. 13 No. 5 in A major, G 281
String Quintet Op. 13 No. 6 in E major, G 282
String Quintet Op. 18 No. 1 in C minor, G 283
String Quintet Op. 18 No. 2 in D major, G 284
String Quintet Op. 18 No. 3 in E flat major, G 285
String Quintet Op. 18 No. 4 in C major, G 286
String Quintet Op. 18 No. 5 in D minor, G 287
String Quintet Op. 18 No. 6 in E major, G 288
String Quintet Op. 20 No. 1 in E flat major, G 289
String Quintet Op. 20 No. 2 in B flat major, G 290
String Quintet Op. 20 No. 3 in F major, G 291
String Quintet Op. 20 No. 4 in G major, G 292
String Quintet Op. 20 No. 5 in D minor, G 293
String Quintet Op. 20 No. 6 in A minor, G 294
String Quintet Op. 25 No. 1 in D minor, G 295
String Quintet Op. 25 No. 2 in E flat major, G 296
String Quintet Op. 25 No. 3 in A major, G 297
String Quintet Op. 25 No. 4 in C major, G 298
String Quintet Op. 25 No. 5 in D major, G 299
String Quintet Op. 25 No. 6 in A minor, G 300
String Quintet Op. 27 No. 1 in A major, G 301
String Quintet Op. 27 No. 2 in G major, G 302
String Quintet Op. 27 No. 3 in E minor, G 303
String Quintet Op. 27 No. 4 in E flat major, G 304
String Quintet Op. 27 No. 5 in G minor, G 305
String Quintet Op. 27 No. 6 in B minor, G 306
String Quintet Op. 28 No. 1 in F major, G 307
String Quintet Op. 28 No. 2 in A major, G 308
String Quintet Op. 28 No. 3 in E flat major, G 309
String Quintet Op. 28 No. 4 in C major, G 310
String Quintet Op. 28 No. 5 in D minor, G 311
String Quintet Op. 28 No. 6 in B flat major, G 312
String Quintet Op. 29 No. 1 in D major, G 313
String Quintet Op. 29 No. 2 in C minor, G 314
String Quintet Op. 29 No. 3 in F major, G 315
String Quintet Op. 29 No. 4 in A major, G 316
String Quintet Op. 29 No. 5 in E flat major, G 317
String Quintet Op. 29 No. 6 in G minor, G 318
String Quintet Op. 30 No. 1 in B flat major, G 319
String Quintet Op. 30 No. 2 in A minor, G 320
String Quintet Op. 30 No. 3 in C major, G 321
String Quintet Op. 30 No. 4 in E flat major, G 322
String Quintet Op. 30 No. 5 in E minor, G 323
String Quintet Op. 30 No. 6 in C major ("Musica notturna delle strade di Madrid"), G 324
String Quintet Op. 31 No. 1 in E flat major, G 325
String Quintet Op. 31 No. 2 in G major, G 326
String Quintet Op. 31 No. 3 in B flat major, G 327
String Quintet Op. 31 No. 4 in C minor, G 328
String Quintet Op. 31 No. 5 in A major, G 329
String Quintet Op. 31 No. 6 in F major, G 330
String Quintet Op. 36 No. 1 in E flat major, G 331
String Quintet Op. 36 No. 2 in D major, G 332
String Quintet Op. 36 No. 3 in G major, G 333
String Quintet Op. 36 No. 4 in A minor, G 334
String Quintet Op. 36 No. 5 in G minor, G 335
String Quintet Op. 36 No. 6 in F major, G 336
String Quintet Op. 39 No. 1 in B flat major, G 337
String Quintet Op. 39 No. 2 in F major, G 338
String Quintet Op. 39 No. 3 in D major, G 339
String Quintet Op. 40 No. 1 in A major, G 340
String Quintet Op. 40 No. 2 in D major, G 341
String Quintet Op. 40 No. 3 in D major, G 342
String Quintet Op. 40 No. 4 in C major, G 343
String Quintet Op. 40 No. 5 in E minor, G 344
String Quintet Op. 40 No. 6 in B flat major, G 345
String Quintet Op. 41 No. 1 in E flat major, G 346
String Quintet Op. 41 No. 2 in F major, G 347
String Quintet Op. 42 No. 1 in F minor, G 348
String Quintet Op. 42 No. 2 in C major, G 349
String Quintet Op. 42 No. 3 in B minor, G 350
String Quintet Op. 42 No. 4 in G minor, G 351
String Quintet Op. 43 No. 1 in E flat major, G 352
String Quintet Op. 43 No. 2 in D major, G 353
String Quintet Op. 43 No. 3 in F major, G 354
String Quintet Op. 45 No. 1 in C minor, G 355
String Quintet Op. 45 No. 2 in A major, G 356
String Quintet Op. 45 No. 3 in B flat major, G 357
String Quintet Op. 45 No. 4 in C major, G 358
String Quintet Op. 46 No. 1 in B flat major, G 359
String Quintet Op. 46 No. 2 in D minor, G 360
String Quintet Op. 46 No. 3 in C major, G 361
String Quintet Op. 46 No. 4 in G minor, G 362
String Quintet Op. 46 No. 5 in F major, G 363
String Quintet Op. 46 No. 6 in E flat major, G 364
String Quintet Op. 49 No. 1 in D major, G 365
String Quintet Op. 49 No. 2 in B flat major, G 366
String Quintet Op. 49 No. 3 in E flat major, G 367
String Quintet Op. 49 No. 4 in D minor, G 368
String Quintet Op. 49 No. 5 in E flat major, G 369
String Quintet Op. 50 No. 1 in A major, G 370
String Quintet Op. 50 No. 2 in E flat major, G 371
String Quintet Op. 50 No. 3 in B flat major, G 372
String Quintet Op. 50 No. 4 in E major, G 373
String Quintet Op. 50 No. 5 in C major, G 374
String Quintet Op. 50 No. 6 in B flat major, G 375
String Quintet Op. 51 No. 1 in E flat major, G 376
String Quintet Op. 51 No. 2 in C minor, G 377
String Quintet in C major, G 378
String Quintet in E minor (from G 407), G 379
String Quintet in F major (from G 408), G 380
String Quintet in E flat major (from G 410), G 381
String Quintet in A minor (from G 412), G 382
String Quintet in D major (from G 411), G 383
String Quintet in C major (from G 409), G 384
String Quintet in D minor (from G 416), G 385
String Quintet in E minor (from G 417), G 386
String Quintet in B flat major (from G 414), G 387
String Quintet in A major (from G 413), G 388
String Quintet in E minor (from G 415), G 389
String Quintet in C major (from G 418), G 390
String Quintet Op. 60 No. 1 in C major, G 391
String Quintet Op. 60 No. 2 in B flat major, G 392
String Quintet Op. 60 No. 3 in A major, G 393
String Quintet Op. 60 No. 4 in E flat major (lost), G 394
String Quintet Op. 60 No. 5 in G major, G 395
String Quintet Op. 60 No. 6 in E major, G 396
String Quintet Op. 62 No. 1 in C major, G 397
String Quintet Op. 62 No. 2 in E flat major, G 398
String Quintet Op. 62 No. 3 in F major, G 399
String Quintet Op. 62 No. 4 in B flat major, G 400
String Quintet Op. 62 No. 5 in D major, G 401
String Quintet Op. 62 No. 6 in E major, G 402
String Quintet in E flat major (lost), G 406
Also: "String Quintet in C major" put together by Johann Lauterbach (1832-1918) from unrelated Boccherini string quintet movements
Aleksandr Borodin (1833-87)
String Quintet in F minor (1853-4: unfinished; completed by O. Evlakhov)
Luigi Cherubini (1760-1842)
String Quintet in E minor (1837)
Carl Ditters von Dittersdorf (1739-99)
Six string quintets
Henry Eccles (1670-1742)
Sonata in G minor for cello and strings
(This is actually a sonata for viola da gamba and figured bass and not a string quintet. The version for cello and strings is a transcription. This sonata is also often played in a transcription for cello and piano.)
Aleksandr Glazunov (1865-1936)
String Quintet in A major, Op. 39 (1891-2)
Karl Goldmark (1820-1915)
String Quintet in A minor, Op. 9 (1862)
Jay Greenberg (born 1991)
String Quintet (2005)
George Onslow (1784-1853)
Twenty-two string quintets
Three further string quintets with two versions, either for 2 violins, viola and 2 cellos or for 2 violins, 2 violas and cello
Anton Reicha (1770-1836)
Three string quintets
Franz Schubert (1797-1828)
Quintet in C major, D. 956, Op. 163 (1828)
Peter Seabourne (born 1960)
String Quintet
Adrien-François Servais (1807-66)
Souvenir de Spa for cello and strings
Sergey Taneyev (1856-1915)
String Quintet no. 1 in G major, Op. 14 (1900–01)

"Double bass" quintets
String quintets with two violins, viola, cello and double bass

Luigi Boccherini (1743-1805)
String Quintet Op. 39 No. 1 in B flat major, G 337 (1787)
String Quintet Op. 39 No. 2 in F major, G 338 (1787)
String Quintet Op. 39 No. 3 in D major, G 339 (1787)
Carl Ditters von Dittersdorf (1739-99)
Six string quintets (with non-obbligato horns)
Antonín Dvořák (1841-1904)
String Quintet in G major, Op. 77 (1875)
Alistair Hinton (born 1950)
String Quintet (1969–77)
George Onslow (1784-1853)
Six string quintets

See also
 String instrument repertoire

Sources
 Grove Music Online
 Jeffery, Paul 'A Player's Guide to Chamber Music' (Robert Hale, 2017)